Miss Thang is the debut studio album by American R&B recording artist Monica. It was released by Rowdy Records and distributed through the Arista label on July 18, 1995 in the United States. Recorded throughout her early teenage years, the album was conceived under the guidance of Rowdy head Dallas Austin who would emerge as a tutor and father figure to Monica and serve as Miss Thangs sole executive producer. Austin recruited protégés from his DARP production camp such as Tim & Bob, Arnold Hennings, and Colin Wolfe as well as Daryl Simmons, and Soulshock & Karlin to work on the album. It incorporates a wide range of contemporary genres such as soul, pop, hip hop and blues. 

Upon release, Miss Thang received generally mixed to positive reviews from music critics, who complimented Monica's versatility and mature sound appearance, as well as the album's eclectic number of songs. A steady seller, the album became a commercial success as well. It debuted and peaked at number 36 of the Billboard 200 and reached the top ten on the Top R&B/Hip-Hop Albums in the United States, where it was certified three-times Platinum by the Recording Industry Association of America (RIAA) and sold over 1.5 million copies. Internationally, it earned Gold status in Canada, where it reached number 20 on RPMs Top Albums/CDs chart, and peaked at number nine on the New Zealand Albums Chart, her highest peak as of 2018.

Four singles were released from the album, including debut single "Don't Take It Personal (Just One of Dem Days)" and follow-up "Before You Walk Out of My Life", both of which made Monica the youngest artist ever to have two consecutive chart-topping hits on the Billboard Hot R&B Singles chart and became top ten hits in New Zealand. With her further two singles, "Like This and Like That" and "Why I Love You So Much" also reaching the top three on the Hot R&B Songs, Monica, along with fellow teen singers Aaliyah and Brandy, established herself as one of the most successful R&B female vocalists to emerge during the mid-to late 1990s. It also earned her four Soul Train Music Awards nods as well as American Music Award and Billboard Music Award nominations each.

Background and production 
In 1992, after winning a series of local talent contests, Monica was introduced to music producer Dallas Austin. Impressed by her voice and persona after hearing her perform Whitney Houston's 1986 hit single "Greatest Love of All", Austin offered her a record deal with his Arista-distributed label Rowdy Records at the age of 12. A teacher and growing father figure, Austin became instrumental in tutoring the young singer, while executive producing her debut album under the Rowdy rooster. A breakaway from regular teenage life, he would often pick her up after school and whisk her off to a music studio most evenings. Austin also consulted Flavor Unit, owned rapper Queen Latifah, to serve as Monica's management and arranged recording sessions with his in-house protégés Arnold Hennings, Tim & Bob, and Colin Wolfe for her debut. In addition, Carsten Schack and Kenneth Karlin from Danish production duo Soulshock & Karlin would hand in their yet-unreleased song "Before You Walk Out of My Life", a leftover from Toni Braxton's second studio album Secrets (1996), for Monica to record.

With much of the album being recorded during her years of 1993 and 1995, her teenage years, Monica has described the period as hard work: "It was more from the stress I put on myself than it was pressure from others," she said. "There were so many young artists releasing records, and I wanted to stand out. I was a regular female growing up in the inner city, and I wanted to be who I was." Throughout the recording process, Arnold ensured the album's music and lyrical content reflected her persona. As a result, she vetoed some of the songs selected for the album. "I was very assertive in making sure the album was really me," she said in an interview with Billboard. "How can you show your feeling in a song when it's about something you don't know about?" Commenting on the album title, Monica later elaborated: “Dallas [Austin] would bring producers in the studio to play records for me and I’d be quick to say ‘No’ if I didn’t feel it. I knew who I was and what I wanted to say. That’s where Miss Thang came from. He’d say, ‘Miss Thang don’t like it!’."

Critical reception 

Miss Thang received generally mixed to positive reviews from music critics. Billboard complimented the album for its "strong, today-styled hip-hop and R&B melodies" and Monica's singing versatility. The magazine noted that the "clever production maintains set's overall high energy, while remaining secondary to singer's vocals – creating a youthful, but eclectic 16 tracks." In his review for Allmusic, editor Craig Lytle rated the album three out of five stars and wrote that "the album focuses on hip-hop and contemporary urban cuts, including a pair of R&B chart-toppers." He felt that "in spite of her youthful age, Monica conveys a surprisingly mature sound." The New York Timess Kevin Sack found that "producer Dallas Austin injected this debut album with plenty of attitude."

The Los Angeles Times writer Connie Johnson wrote that "fourteen-year-old Monica is the best teen singer to come along since, well, Brandy. While "Don't Take It Personal," an urban radio staple, only hints at her abilities, she tackles Latimore's old-school classic "Let's Straighten It Out" with all the clear-eyed assertiveness of an R&B veteran. Miss Thang indeed." Christian Hoard, writing for The Rolling Stone Album Guide, called Miss Thang "an assured, streetwise amalgam of soul, pop, hip-hop, and blues". While he found praise for the up-tempo songs on the album, Hoard was less impressed with "the record's many soppy, MOR ballads" such as "Before You Walk Out of My Life". In November 2017, Complex magazine ranked the album 23rd on its The 50 Best R&B Albums of the '90s listing. In his retrospective review, editor Justin Charity wrote that "at 15, Monica dropped a debut that's as tender-loving and mature as her R&B elders; though she's less funky than Janet Jackson, Monica stepped correct with New Jack confidence on Miss Thang."

Singles
The album was supported by four singles. Debut single "Don't Take It Personal (Just One of Dem Days)" reached number two on the US Billboard Hot 100 and became a top ten hot in Austria and New Zealand, where it ranks among Monica's highest-charting singles. Follow-up "Before You Walk Out of My Life," released on a double-A-side with "Like This and Like That" became a top ten hit in the US and, along with "Don't Take It Personal" made Monica, at the age of 14, the youngest recording artist to have two consecutive number-one hits on Billboards Hot R&B Songs. Ballad "Why I Love You So Much," released together with "Ain't Nobody," a collaboration with Treach from  American hip hop trio Naughty by Nature, recorded for the soundtrack of the 1996 motion picture The Nutty Professor, became another top ten entry in the year of 1996.

 Commercial performance 
Miss Thang debuted and peaked at number 36 on the Billboard 200
with first week sales of 31,500 units sold. For the week ending on August 5, 1995 the album entered the Top R&B/Hip-Hop Albums chart at number 9.  25 weeks after it debuted it reached its peak at number 7 for the week ending on January 20, 1996. Towards the end of 1995 and 1996, Billboard ranked the album at number 65 and 22 respectively on its Top R&B/Hip-Hop Albums year-end chart. By March 2002 the album sold 1.35 million copies, 
and as of April 2012 it has sold 1.5 million copies, according to Billboard. In January 2000, Miss Thang was certified triple platinum by the Recording Industry Association of America (RIAA) for shipments of 3 million copies. 

In Canada, the album debuted on RPMs Top Albums/CDs chart at number 88, during the week ending on August 21, 1995. In its 5th week on the chart the album reached its peak at number 20, during the week of September 18, 1995. Overall, the album had spent a total of 23 consecutive weeks on the Top Albums/CDs chart. For shipments in excess of 50,000 copies, it earned a gold certification from Music Canada on April 12, 1996. Elsewhere, Miss Thang peaked at number 42 on the Dutch  MegaCharts and number nine on the New Zealand Albums Chart, Monica's highest peak on the latter chart as of 2018. In addition, it reached number 24 on the UK R&B Albums chart, according to the Official Charts Company (OCC).

 Track listing 

Samples credits
"Don't Take It Personal (Just One of Dem Days)" contains elements of The Detroit Emeralds' 1973 "You're Gettin' a Little Too Smart", LL Cool J's 1993 "Back Seat (of My Jeep)" and Public Enemy's 1987 "Bring the Noise".
"Like This and Like That" contains elements of Spoonie Gee's 1979 "Spoonin' Rap".
"Skate" contains elements of One Way's 1982 "Cutie Pie".
"Tell Me If You Still Care" is a cover version of S.O.S. Band's 1983 original recording.
"Let's Straighten It Out" is a cover version of Benny Latimore's 1974 original recording.
The remix of "Don't Take It Personal (Just One of Dem Days)" contains elements of Jermaine Jackson's 1989 "Don't Take It Personal".

 Credits and personnel 
Credits for the liner notes adapted from Miss Thang.Instruments and performances Colin Wolfe – bass
 Kenneth Crouch – piano
 Derrick Edmondson – flute, saxophone, horn
 Tommy Martin – guitar
 Derek Organ – drums
 Sandy Lawrence – art direction
 Tim Kelley – producer, arranger, drum programming, keyboards,
 Bob Robinson – keyboard, product
 Dallas Austin, Ron Gresham, Ron Gresham, Michael Patterson, Darin Prindle – mixingTechnical and production'
 Debra Killings, Monica, Lysette Titi, Usher – Background Vocals
 Naim Ali, Dallas Austin, Caron Veazey – creative director
 Arvel McClinton III – programming

Charts

Weekly charts

Year-end charts

Certifications

References

External links 
 Monica.com — official site

1995 debut albums
Albums produced by Dallas Austin
Albums produced by Soulshock and Karlin
Albums produced by Tim & Bob
Monica (singer) albums